The Big Banana is a tourist attraction and amusement park in the city of Coffs Harbour, New South Wales, Australia. The grounds of the park are set amongst a banana plantation, featuring a large walk-through banana. Built in 1964, it was one of Australia's first Big Things. Other attractions include a downhill toboggan ride, ice skating rink, a water park and the World of Bananas educational experience. Plantation tours are also available. On the evening of Australia Day 2014, a disused scenic lookout attraction was destroyed by fire. In keeping with the plantation theme, banana-related products are shown or sold in the park which also has a souvenir shop and restaurant. In January 2014, during the peak tourist season the Big Banana received close to 150,000 visitors. The Big Banana has been a family owned business since it was open by Patrick Hughes in 1964.

The original Big Banana has been copied by the Big Bananas at Carnarvon, Western Australia.

In 2011, Huffington Post included the Big Banana in their list of the "Top 10 Pieces of Folly Architecture."

Attractions

Current 
Along with the Big Banana which is 15m long, featuring the Racer 82m slide, the site includes laser tag, mini golf, ice skating rink, a theatre providing an educational experience, and a toboggan ride, a water park and a reptile zoo.

Former 
The park featured three scenic monorail sets driven on a two beam track. The monorail's track linked display buildings and transported visitors up the steep slope of the plantation.

In 2005, a broken down set was being pushed by one of the two other sets to a maintenance shed for repairs when the coupling system failed and the broken down set ploughed into the lagoon within the park.

The track passed by a lagoon that featured an animatronic bunyip, which was shut off in 2005 due to budget constraints.

Much of the track remains throughout the park and plantations while the two car sets that remained have been left unattended on tracks each near a disused buildings.

Postage stamps 
Australia Post issued a set of 50c postage stamps in 2007 commemorating big things, including the Big Banana. The other big thing stamps were:
 (Big) Golden Guitar at Tamworth, New South Wales
 Big Lobster at Kingston SE, South Australia
 Big Merino (sheep) at Goulburn, New South Wales
 Big Pineapple at Nambour, Queensland

See also

Australia's big things
List of world's largest roadside attractions

References

External links
 

Big things in New South Wales
Buildings and structures completed in 1964
1964 sculptures
Mid North Coast
Amusement parks in New South Wales
Bananas in popular culture
Coffs Harbour
1964 establishments in Australia
Ice rinks